Goombas , known in Japan as , are a fictional mushroom-like species from Nintendo's Mario franchise. They first appeared in the NES video game Super Mario Bros. as the first enemy players encounter. They have appeared outside video games, including in film, television, and other media. They are usually brown and are most commonly seen walking around aimlessly, often as an obstacle, in video games. They were included late in the development of Super Mario Bros. as a simple, easy-to-defeat enemy.

The species is considered one of the most iconic elements of the Super Mario series, appearing in nearly every game in the series, and is often ranked amongst the most famous enemies in video games. In 2009, Crave Online described it as the series' "everyman". The video game incarnation has been made into several plush toys.

Concept and creation

Goombas were introduced in the video game Super Mario Bros., and were the last enemy added to the game after play testers stated that the Koopa Troopa was too tricky as an enemy. As a result, the designers decided to introduce the Goomba as a basic enemy. However, they had very little space left in the game. They used a single image twice to convey the notion that the Goombas are walking, flipping it back and forth, causing it to look lopsided as it walks, and giving the appearance of a trot. The Goomba's resemblance to the Super Mushroom forced designers to change the mechanics and appearance of the Super Mushroom. They used the Goomba's ability to be jumped on and defeated to teach players how to deal with enemies and to not fear the Super Mushroom.

Goombas resemble shiitake, with bushy eyebrows and a pair of fangs sprouting from their lower jaw. They also appear to have shoe-like feet coming from their stalks.

Early concept art for the Super Mario Bros. film showed that the design of the Goombas were originally intended to be for Koopa Troopas, another kind of Mario enemy. A separate company from the primary makeup departments designed the Goombas in the film.

Name
The name Goomba is derived from "Goombah" (from Sicilian cumpà which translates to "mate" or "fellow") which refers to an Italian American man. Also, in Hungarian gomba means "mushroom". In Japan, Goombas are called "Kuribō", which loosely translates as "chestnut person".

Appearances

Goombas debuted in Super Mario Bros., described in the manual as Little Goomba, and have reappeared in nearly all later games in the series. In the 2D games, they walk aimlessly in a straight line, turning only at walls. They can be defeated by jumping on them, which flattens them. In Super Mario 64, and all their 3D Mario appearances, they will pursue Mario when he is near (instead of just walking aimlessly).

Several variations of the Goomba have appeared. There are larger versions called , (also called Giant Goombas,  or Mega Goombas), and smaller versions called  (or ). In one level of Super Mario Bros. 3, Goombas can be seen wearing a shoe called "Goomba's Shoe". Super Mario World replaces the normal Goomba with a more round variation, later named . Other variations include  (first seen in Super Mario Galaxy),  (first seen in New Super Mario Bros. 2),  (first seen in Super Mario 3D Land),  (first seen in New Super Mario Bros. Some games also feature stacks of Goombas called . A giant goomba called Mega Goomba appears as a boss in New Super Mario Bros.. In Super Mario Odyssey, Goombas wear hats that depend on what kingdom they are in. They can be captured, which allows them to form Goomba Towers. 

Goombas appear in each of the Mario role-playing games. Super Mario RPG introduces the first non-hostile Goombas, while the follow-up game Paper Mario introduces a Goomba village, and a playable  character called Goombario. A second playable Paper Goomba is introduced in The Thousand-Year Door called Goombella. Goombas also appear in the six Mario & Luigi titles: Superstar Saga, Partners in Time, Bowser's Inside Story, and Dream Team. The Goombas meet their paper counterparts, Paper Goombas, in a Paper Mario and Mario & Luigi crossover game, Mario & Luigi: Paper Jam. Bowser's Inside Story features Goomba-form cells who think Mario and company are viruses, and outside Bowser's body, they are used in one of Bowser's special attacks. In Mario & Luigi: Superstar Saga + Bowser's Minions, a Goomba takes the role of a captain to lead his troops and battle to save Bowser from Fawful. Goombas have appeared in several other spin-off titles in and out of the Mario series, including the second, third, fourth, and fifth titles of the Super Smash Bros. series, Super Smash Bros. Melee, Super Smash Bros. Brawl, Super Smash Bros. for Nintendo 3DS and Wii U and Super Smash Bros. Ultimate. They have a playable appearance in Mario baseball video games such as Mario Superstar Baseball and Mario Super Sluggers, as well as in the recent games in the Mario Party series, Super Mario Party and Mario Party Superstars. Goombas are also obstacles in various Mario Kart courses.

In other media

In the 1989 television cartoon The Super Mario Bros. Super Show!, Goombas are loyal soldiers in King Koopa's army. The general appearance of the Goomba resembles the ones found in the Mario video games. In several of the episodes, the Goombas appear as zombies, pirates, or other themed variations in accordance with the plot. When the show spun off into The Adventures of Super Mario Bros. 3, they continued their job as soldiers in the Koopa army in some episodes. However, the Super Mario World cartoon only featured them twice. Goombas were included in an Ice Capades show featuring characters from the Mario series.

In the Super Mario Bros. live-action film, Goombas were originally inhabitants of Dinohattan who opposed the tyrannical President Koopa's rule, and were devolved as punishment for this disloyalty. In the film, upon being de-evolved, these people became Goombas, who were large, reptilian monsters (as opposed to the usual mushroom appearance seen in the games) with hulking bodies and disproportionately small, circular heads, who wore trenchcoats.

Goombas appear as enemies in The Legend of Zelda: Link's Awakening and its remake in the underground side-scrolling passages throughout the game, and also in the seventh dungeon, Eagle's Tower. They can be defeated either by striking them with a sword or by jumping on top of them with Roc's Feather.

A Goomba can also be spotted as an easter egg on "Basic Run" in Wii Fit Plus.

Multiple variations appear in all the games of the Super Smash Bros. series, appearing either as background elements or regular enemies.

Reception and promotion
The Goomba has become an icon of the Mario series, both in its appearance and the concept of "stomping on them", often referenced as one of the key elements of the original Super Mario Bros. The Goomba has appeared in multiple pieces of merchandise, including a Happy Meal toy as part of a Super Mario Bros. 3 promotion by Nintendo and McDonald's. A plush Goomba that plays the Goomba "defeat" noise as well as the Game Over tune at certain points was also released. IGN editor Craig Harris described the Goomba as a "household name" along with Koopa Paratroopas and King Koopa. Video game musician and reviewer Tommy Tallarico commented that many new converts to gaming have "never even made Super Mario smoosh a Goomba". In a criticism of video game storytelling, Gamasutra editor Daniel Cook referenced Goombas being mushrooms, but also that it was a less important fact than them being squat, to-scale with the world, and able to be squashed. In an article discussing happiness in video games, Gamasutra editor Lorenzo Wang listed the sound the Goomba makes when it's squished as one of his pleasures. IGN editor Mark Birnhaum praised the sound effects of Super Mario Bros., giving similar praise to the sound of the Goomba being stomped on. It was compared to the Met enemy from the Mega Man series, calling them the "Goomba of the Mega Man series". In 2009, Crave Online editor Joey Davidson described the Goomba as the series' "everyman", describing it as both defenseless and of little threat, listing such exceptions as the giant Goomba seen in Super Mario Galaxy. A common enemy in Braid has been compared to the Goomba, Gaming Age editor Dustin Chadwell calling it a "slightly skewed version of the Goomba". GameDaily listed Goomba as the fourth best Mario enemy, stating that every gamer has run into one as Mario before. Destructoid listed the deaths of Goombas as one of the six sinister things about Super Mario; saying that "whether or not the Goombas are actually working for Bowser, they certainly don't seem like killers, or even soldiers. They walk around aimlessly, and if you touch them, you get hurt. Is that worth killing over?" Nintendo Power listed them as one of their favorite punching bags, stating that while it's hard not to feel bad for them, it is still satisfying.

The live-action Super Mario Bros. film version of the Goomba has received negative reception. IGN editor Jesse Schedeen called Bowser and his Goombas the most screwed up part of the film, commenting that it would be difficult to create a live action version of the Goomba that deviates from the original version more than this. An Entertainment Weekly article called the design creepy, stating that its "foam-latex skin had to be baked for five hours at 200 degrees to achieve that lovely reptilian effect". The facial design of the character Venom in Spider-Man 3 was compared to the film versions of the Goomba by Crave Online, describing Venom's face as stupid, short, and rounded. Hal Hinson of The Washington Post called the Goombas "big dumb goons with shrunken little dino heads", yet also calling them the "best movie heavies since the flying monkeys in 'The Wizard of Oz.

Notes

References 

Anthropomorphic video game characters
Fictional fungi
Fictional henchmen in video games
Fictional monsters
Mario (franchise) enemies
Video game characters introduced in 1985
Video game species and races